Naohidemyces is a genus of fungi belonging to the family Pucciniastraceae.

The genus has almost cosmopolitan distribution.

Species:

Naohidemyces fujisanensis 
Naohidemyces vaccinii

References

Pucciniales
Basidiomycota genera